Yoshitaka Itō (born 24 November 1948) is a Japanese politician, who has served as a member of the House of Representatives from Hokkaido 7th district since 2009. He is a member of the Liberal Democratic Party.

References

Liberal Democratic Party (Japan) politicians
1948 births
Living people
Place of birth missing (living people)
20th-century Japanese people
21st-century Japanese politicians